Aílton Gonçalves da Silva (born 19 July 1973), also known as Kugelblitz is a Brazilian former professional footballer who played as a striker. A journeyman, Aílton began his career in Brazil where he played for Ypiranga, Internacional, Mogi Mirim, Santa Cruz, and Guarani. Following a stint with Tigres UANL in Mexico, he moved to Germany joining SV Werder Bremen. He spent six seasons with Werder Bremen, winning the double of Bundesliga and cup in the 2003–04 season, before transferring to league rivals FC Schalke 04. In the latter stages of his career he played for Beşiktaş, Hamburger SV, Red Star Belgrade, Grasshoppers Zürich, MSV Duisburg, Metalurh Donetsk, SCR Altach, Campinense, and Chongqing Lifan. He ended his career in the lower leagues with KFC Uerdingen 05, FC Oberneuland, Rio Branco-SP, and Hassia Bingen.

After Stéphane Chapuisat and Giovane Élber, Aílton is the third of six foreign players to have scored more than 100 goals in the Bundesliga, along with Claudio Pizarro, Robert Lewandowski and Vedad Ibišević.

Career
Aílton's career began in Brazil, and he played in his homeland with Mogi Mirim Esporte Clube, Santa Cruz and Guarani. He then moved to Tigres UANL in Mexico, which made way to a 1998–99 move to SV Werder Bremen in Germany.

He had some difficulties in his first season, managing only two league goals, but developed into a strong service provider. Werder Bremen won the DFB-Pokal in 1999. However, Aílton did not take part in the final, which was won on penalties against Bayern Munich. In 1999–00 he scored twelve goals, 13 in 2000–01, 16 in 2001–02 and 2002–03, the following season bringing with it 28 goals. He won the Bundesliga and the German Cup with Werder Bremen. Due to his achievements at Bremen, he was selected in 2004 as the first foreigner to win the Footballer of the Year (Germany) award. The 2004–05 season saw a lucrative move to FC Schalke 04.

Being uncapped by Brazil, in March 2004 the Qatar Football Association tried to incentivise Aílton to play for their national team by offering him Qatari citizenship, an initial €1 million and €400,000 a year for his services. FIFA intervened and blocked the move, tightening international eligibility requirements as a result.

Aílton has been known as an enfant terrible, giving emotional interviews full of melodrama during his time in Germany.

In July 2005, Rıza Çalımbay brought him to Beşiktaş for €, but he failed to show his full potential. Beşiktaş management brought him to the team with high hopes but his lack of scoring touch turned the fans against him and they wanted him replaced with another quality striker as soon as possible. Having failed to find himself a club in January 2006, Aílton had undertaken an escape attempt toward Brazil, but was stopped at the airport by Beşiktaş' interim manager Mehmet Eksi. However, because he had not found a new club during the winter, he returned to Istanbul and faced his old team Werder Bremen in the Efes Cup, scoring a hat trick for Beşiktaş.

He returned to Germany on loan to Hamburger SV in January 2006, but broke his jaw in only his second appearance for the club – an away game against Hannover 96 – and missed most of the remaining season. He scored three times upon his return. As a result, Hamburg did not decide to buy Aílton for a previously agreed sum of €.

Aílton had to return to Beşiktaş where he was still out of favour. As a result, he was transferred to Serbian side Red Star Belgrade where he signed on 31 August 2006. In the winter break of the 2006–07 season Aílton was loaned out to Grasshopper Club Zürich. He managed to score eight goals during his spell in Switzerland. Grasshopper announced not to renew Aílton's contract and he was signed by newly promoted Bundesliga side MSV Duisburg in July 2007 on a one-year contract. Unfortunately, he didn't meet the expectations at his new club. He even showed unprofessional conduct by arriving late from the winter break. The contract was cancelled at end of February 2008, he turned to the Ukraine and Austria before than signed with Campinense on 12 March 2009. In the summer of 2009, he signed a contract with Chinese side Chongqing Lifan. On 2 December 2009 KFC Uerdingen 05 signed the Brazilian forward until 30 June 2011 but he left on 22 July 2010 for FC Oberneuland. The contract with Oberneuland was terminated in mutual agreement on 4 February 2011.

He joined sixth division side Hassia Bingen for the 2012–13 season where he scored two goals on debut after being substituted in the 68th minute and helped the club attract a league record 1,300 spectators for the game.

Personal life
Aílton's wife Rosseli Judith Rodriguez is Mexican and the couple have four children. In January 2012, he took part on Ich bin ein Star – Holt mich hier raus!, the German version of the television game show I'm a Celebrity...Get Me Out of Here!.

Career statistics

Honours
Werder Bremen
 Bundesliga: 2003–04
 DFB-Pokal: 1998–99, 2003–04
 DFB-Ligapokal runner-up: 1999

Schalke 04
 UEFA Intertoto Cup: 2004

Red Star Belgrade
 Serbian SuperLiga: 2006–07

Individual
 Bundesliga top scorer: 2003–04
 Footballer of the Year (Germany): 2004
kicker Bundesliga Team of the Season: 2003–04

References

External links

 
 
 

1973 births
Living people
Brazilian footballers
Association football forwards
Sport Club Internacional players
Mogi Mirim Esporte Clube players
Guarani FC players
SV Werder Bremen players
FC Schalke 04 players
Beşiktaş J.K. footballers
Hamburger SV players
Grasshopper Club Zürich players
MSV Duisburg players
KFC Uerdingen 05 players
SC Rheindorf Altach players
FC Oberneuland players
Red Star Belgrade footballers
Tigres UANL footballers
FC Metalurh Donetsk players
Campinense Clube players
Chongqing Liangjiang Athletic F.C. players
Rio Branco Esporte Clube players
BFV Hassia Bingen players
Kicker-Torjägerkanone Award winners
Campeonato Brasileiro Série A players
Liga MX players
Bundesliga players
Süper Lig players
Ukrainian Premier League players
Serbian SuperLiga players
Chinese Super League players
Swiss Super League players
Austrian Football Bundesliga players
Brazilian expatriate footballers
Brazilian expatriate sportspeople in Mexico
Expatriate footballers in Mexico
Brazilian expatriate sportspeople in Germany
Expatriate footballers in Germany
Brazilian expatriate sportspeople in Turkey
Expatriate footballers in Turkey
Brazilian expatriate sportspeople in Serbia
Expatriate footballers in Serbia
Brazilian expatriate sportspeople in Switzerland
Expatriate footballers in Switzerland
Brazilian expatriate sportspeople in Ukraine
Expatriate footballers in Ukraine
Brazilian expatriate sportspeople in Austria
Expatriate footballers in Austria
Brazilian expatriate sportspeople in China
Expatriate footballers in China
Ich bin ein Star – Holt mich hier raus! participants